Bharatiya Janata Party, West Bengal (or BJP West Bengal) is a state unit of the Bharatiya Janata Party in the Indian state of West Bengal. The headquarters is located in Kolkata.

The BJP came into being after a split from the Janata party. The prominent members of BJP had been the part of the Bharatiya Jana Sangh founded by Syama Prasad Mukherjee. Jana Sangh was the political arm of Rashtriya Swayamsevak Sangh and was dissolved in 1977. In 2015, Dilip Ghosh was appointed by the party leadership as the president of the BJP West Bengal.

History

1980s
The Bharatiya Janata Party contested the West Bengal assembly election for the first time in 1982. The primary objective of the party was to create a nucleus for a future third force in West Bengal politics. The party supported the call of the West Bengal government to hold the elections in March 1982. The party contested on 52 assembly constituencies and got around 129,994 votes in the state.

In 1984 Lok Sabha election, BJP contested on 9 seats and got 101165 (0.4%) votes in West Bengal.

In the 1987 the party contested on 57 constituencies and slightly increased its votes to 134,867.

In 1989 Lok Sabha election, BJP contested on 19 seats and got 529618 (1.67%) votes in West Bengal.

1990s
The Bharatiya Janata Party fielded 291 candidates across the state in 1991 Vidhan Sabha election, and managed to increase its share of votes from 0.51% in 1987 to 11.34% (3,513,121 votes). This was the first time BJP fielded such a large number of candidates in West Bengal assembly elections. The party also fielded 42 candidates for the 1991 Lok Sabha election which took place simultaneously with the Vidhan Sabha election. The BJP got 3624974 (11.66%) votes in this election. Rather than focusing primarily on the Ayodhya issue, which was highlighted in the BJP campaigns across the country, the West Bengal BJP campaign concentrated on agitations against immigration from Bangladesh. The campaign sought to invoke Bengali memories of Partition. Whilst support for BJP increased amongst Bengali communities, its main stronghold in the state remained non-Bengali populations in Calcutta (Marwaris and Gujaratis).

In 1996, both Assembly election and Lok Sabha election took place simultaneously, the party contested on 292 assembly constituencies and got 2,372,480 (6.45%) votes and contested 42 Lok Sabha seats and got 2525864 (6.88%) votes across the state.

In 1998, the BJP contested on 14 seats and won 1 Lok Sabha seat for the first time in West Bengal from Dum Dum. It got 3724662 (10.2%) votes. Tapan Sikdar, who was serving as the West Bengal State President of BJP, won the Dum Dum constituency with 631,383 (50.7%) votes defeating nearest rival Nirmal Kanti Chatterjee of the CPI (M).

In 1999, the BJP in an alliance with All India Trinamool Congress contested 13 seats and won 2 Lok Sabha seats and got 3,928,424 votes (11.13). The two elected Member of Parliament, Lok Sabha were Satyabrata Mookherjee from Krishnanagar with 43.82% votes and Tapan Sikdar from Dum Dum with 51.59% votes.

2000s
In 2001 Assembly election, BJP contested on 266 constituencies and got 1901351 (5.19%) votes throughout the state and 5.68% in seats contested.

In the 2004 Indian general election, the National Democratic Alliance was completely decimated by CPI (M) led Left Front and INC led United Progressive Alliance. The BJP didn't win a single seat and its ally All India Trinamool Congress was reduced to just 1 Lok Sabha seat. The BJP however managed to get 2983950 (8.06%) votes.

In the 2006 Assembly election, BJP entered into an alliance with the All India Trinamool Congress and contested on 29 constituencies. The BJP got 760236 (1.93%) votes throughout West Bengal and 19.89% on seats it contested.

In 2009 Indian general election, BJP candidate Jaswant Singh, with support from Gorkha Janmukti Morcha, won the Darjeeling Lok Sabha seat getting a total of 4,97,649 (51.50%) votes. Across the state BJP got only 6.14% votes.

2010s
In 2011 Legislative Assembly election the BJP allied with GJM.

In 2014 Indian general election the BJP won only 2 seats. BJP candidates for the first time, returned runner-up in 3 seats and got 17.2% vote share throughout the state. This performance was better than BJP's previous best of 11.66% in 1991 elections. However the All India Trinamool Congress dominated the election winning 34 seats.

In 2016 Assembly election the BJP in an alliance with GJM contested 291 seats and got 5,555,134 (10.16%) votes and created history by winning 3 assembly seats for the first time.

There was a major political shift from the left to the right in the 2019 Lok Sabha election in West Bengal. The Bharatiya Janata Party, won 18 Lok Sabha seats out of the 42 constituencies with 23,028,343 (40.25%) votes. On 24 May 2019, The Statesman reported that BJP had made CPI-M a marginalised party and setting a strong challenge to the ruling Trinamool Congress. The shift in the voting pattern was seen across the state.

After the election the Government of India passed the Citizenship (Amendment) Act, 2019 (CAA) in the Parliament, allowing a quicker route to citizenship to non Muslim immigrants from neighbouring countries. The party hoped to benefit from the votes of the Hindu immigrants from Bangladesh.

Post 2020
The BJP's Bengali booklet released in January 2020 claimed that the National Register of Citizens will be implemented to identify any undocumented migrants including Hindus, Sikhs, Muslims and non-Muslims by the Citizenship Amendment Act.

Electoral performance

Legislative Assembly election

Lok Sabha election

Leadership
The West Bengal BJP has one president, twelve vice presidents and five general secretaries & twelve secretaries. As of September 2021, the President of the West Bengal state branch of the party is Dr. Sukanta Majumder.

List of State Presidents

Elected members

Incumbent member(s) of Parliament

Incumbent member(s) of Legislative Assembly

List of opposition leaders

See also
 Bharatiya Janata Party, Gujarat
 Bharatiya Janata Party, Uttar Pradesh
 Bharatiya Janata Party, Madhya Pradesh
 State units of the Bharatiya Janata Party 
 West Bengal Pradesh Congress Committee

References

General and cited sources

External links
 

West Bengal
West Bengal